Josie de Guzman, also known as Jossie de Guzman, is an American actress and singer of Puerto Rican descent, best known for work in the theatre.

Career 
Born in New York, NY in 1979. Graduated from the Academia del Perpetuo Socorro. After studying at the Boston Conservatory of Music, Guzman made her Broadway debut in 1978 as Lidia in the original production of Elizabeth Swados's Runaways. She returned to Broadway the following year to portray Gia Campbell in the original production of Joseph Stein and Alan Jay Lerner's Carmelina.

In 1980 she was handpicked by Leonard Bernstein to portray Maria in the 1980 revival of West Side Story for which she received her first Tony Award nomination. She returned to Broadway in 1992 to portray Sarah Brown in Jerry Zaks's critically acclaimed revival of Frank Loesser's Guys and Dolls with Nathan Lane, Peter Gallagher, and Faith Prince. For her performance she earned a second Tony Award nomination. The recording of the production was filmed for broadcast on PBS's Great Performances. She is currently a member of the Acting Company of the Alley Theatre in Houston, Texas.

Although Guzman's career has been in theatre, she has occasionally performed on television and in films. Her television credits include The Tenth Month (1979), Miami Vice (1984), Reading Rainbow (1998), and Third Watch (2002). Her film credits include F/X (1986)

Filmography

Film

Television

Stage

References

External links

American musical theatre actresses
Living people
Boston Conservatory at Berklee alumni
Year of birth missing (living people)
Place of birth missing (living people)
21st-century American women